The 1944 Women's Western Open was a golf competition held at Park Ridge Country Club in Park Ridge, Illinois, the 15th edition of the event. Babe Zaharias won the championship in match play competition by defeating Dorothy Germain in the final match, 7 and 5.

Women's Western Open
Golf in Illinois
Park Ridge, Illinois
Women's Western Open
Women's Western Open
Women's Western Open
Women's sports in Illinois